José da Costa e Silva (25 July 1747 – 21 March 1819) was a Portuguese architect. His work helped establish Neoclassical architecture in Portugal and colonial Brazil.

Costa e Silva studied architecture in Rome, where he had contact with Italian Neoclassicism. He later became Royal architect, and headed several important projects in Portugal. Among his most important works are the Royal Theatre of São Carlos (1792) in Lisbon and the Military Hospital (1792) near Torres Vedras. He is also believed to be the author of Seteais Palace (1801) in Sintra. In Lisbon, Costa e Silva and the Italian Francisco Xavier Fabri created the project for the Royal Palace of Ajuda (after 1802), which was however too grandiose and could not be completed.

In 1807, Costa e Silva went to Brazil together with John VI and the Portuguese court, which had to escape the invasion of Portugal by Napoleonic troops. In Rio de Janeiro, which became capital of the Portuguese Empire, Costa e Silva designed an opera house in Neoclassical style. This opera house, called Royal Theatre of St John and modelled after the São Carlos of Lisbon, was one of the first Neoclassical buildings in Brazilian soil. It was later destroyed in a fire.

References 

Portuguese architects
Brazilian architects
1747 births
1819 deaths
18th-century Portuguese people
19th-century Portuguese people
People from Vila Franca de Xira
18th-century architects
19th-century architects